Joe Kendrick may refer to:

Joseph Kendrick (sculptor) (1755–?), British sculptor
Joe Kendrick (footballer, born 1905) (1905–1965), Irish footballer who played during the 1920s and 1930s 
Joe Kendrick (footballer, born 1983), Irish footballer and great nephew of above